Matthew Bassett is an American healthcare executive and government official. President Donald Trump nominated him to serve as Assistant Secretary for Legislation in the United States Department of Health and Human Services. Bassett was previously a senior executive at health companies myNEXUS and Davita Inc. He held senior staff positions in the United States House of Representatives and served the Governor of Kentucky as chief of staff to Kentucky's Cabinet for Health and Family Services, where he worked to reform the state's Medicaid and insurance markets. Bassett serves on the board of directors for the Access Tennessee Health Insurance Pool.

References

External links
Trump Town | Health and Human Services | Matthew Bassett on ProPublica.org

Living people
People from Coral Gables, Florida
Baylor University alumni
Trinity University (Texas) alumni
Trump administration personnel
Year of birth missing (living people)